Kráľovičove Kračany is a village and municipality in the Dunajská Streda District in the Trnava Region of south-west Slovakia.

Geography
The municipality lies at an altitude of 117 metres and covers an area of 13.279 km².

History
In the 9th century, the territory of Kráľovičove Kračany became part of the Kingdom of Hungary. In historical records the village was first mentioned in 1215 when King Andrew II of Hungary upon request of the archbishop of Esztergom acquitted a certain Zida, Algo, Bucha és Paul from the service at the Pozsony Castle and ordered them for the service of the archbishop together with their village recorded as „Corcha”. The name is recorded in 1349 as "Kyralfaia"”, while in 1353 as "Keralifiakarcha". The name means in Hungarian "Karcsa of the King’s son". According to the tradition, the inhabitants of the village were the descendants of the Korczán clan.

Until the end of World War I, it was part of Hungary and fell within the Dunaszerdahely district of Pozsony County. After the Austro-Hungarian army disintegrated in November 1918, Czechoslovakian troops occupied the area. After the Treaty of Trianon of 1920, the village became officially part of Czechoslovakia. In November 1938, the First Vienna Award granted the area to Hungary which held it until 1945. After Soviet occupation in 1945, Czechoslovakian administration returned and the village became officially part of Czechoslovakia in 1947.

Demography 
At the 2001 Census the recorded population of the village was 967 while an end-2008 estimate by the Statistical Office had the villages's population as 1028. As of 2001, 90.18% of its population was Hungarian and 8.69% Slovak. Roman Catholicism is the majority religion of the village, its adherents numbering 89.45% of the total population.

References

External links
News related to the village 

Villages and municipalities in Dunajská Streda District
Hungarian communities in Slovakia